The Brothers Johnson were an American funk and R&B band consisting of the American brothers George ("Lightnin' Licks") and Louis E. Johnson ("Thunder Thumbs"). They achieved their greatest success from the mid-1970s to early 1980s, with three singles topping the R&B charts ("I'll Be Good to You", "Strawberry Letter 23", and "Stomp!").

Background

Formation
Guitarist/vocalist George and bassist/vocalist Louis formed the band Johnson Three Plus One with older brother Tommy and their cousin Alex Weir while attending school in Los Angeles, California. When they became professionals, the band backed such touring R&B acts as Bobby Womack and the Supremes. George and Louis Johnson later joined Billy Preston's band and wrote selections for his albums Music Is My Life and The Kids & Me before leaving his group in 1973. In 1976, the Brothers covered the Beatles' song, "Hey Jude", for the musical documentary All This and World War II.

Quincy Jones hired them to play on his LP Mellow Madness, and recorded four of their songs, including "Is It Love That We're Missing?" and "Just a Taste of Me".

After touring with various artists including Bobby Womack and Billy Preston, they were hired by Quincy Jones for a tour in Japan and produced their debut album Look Out for #1, released in March 1976, which went to number 9 on the U.S. Billboard chart. Their Right on Time album was released in May 1977 and reached number 13 on the Billboard Hot 200. Blam!! came out in August 1978 and reached number 7 on the Billboard 200.

Two of the band's songs were featured on the soundtrack of the 1976 film Mother, Jugs & Speed and one on the 1997 film Jackie Brown. The instrumental track "Thunder Thumbs and Lightnin' Licks" refers to the brothers' nicknames. "Get the Funk Out Ma Face" was cowritten with Quincy Jones.

Their popular album Light Up the Night was released in March 1980 and rose to #5 on the Billboard 200. It was number 46 on the "Top 100 LPs of 1980" list in Rolling Stone. The brothers self-produced the subsequent album, Winners; released in July 1981, it only reached #48 on the Billboard 200.

Among their most popular songs are "I'll Be Good to You" (Billboard Hot 100 #3 in 1976) which prominently featured Syreeta Wright, "Strawberry Letter 23" (Hot 100 #5 in 1977, originally recorded by Shuggie Otis), "Ain't We Funkin' Now" (1978), and "Stomp!" (Hot 100 #7 and Hot Dance Music/Club Play #1 in 1980). Their styles include funk, and R&B ballads. Each album also included at least one instrumental cut that would either be considered light jazz ("Tomorrow", 1976; "Q", 1977; "Streetwave", 1978; "Smilin' On Ya", 1980; "Tokyo", 1984) or funk ("Thunder Thumbs & Lightnin' Licks", 1976; "Brother Man", 1977; "Mista' Cool", 1978; "Celebrations", 1980).

1982 split
The duo split up in 1982 to pursue separate projects.

Louis' solo work
Louis Johnson recorded a gospel music album in 1981 with his own group Passage, which included his then-wife Valerie Johnson and former Brothers Johnson percussionist/singer Richard Heath. He played bass on Michael Jackson's Thriller. In 1985 he recorded a single, "Kinky", on Capitol Records; it appears on his Evolution album which was exclusively released in Europe that year. Louis then made 3 instructional videotapes for the Starlicks video-distribution company in which he shared his bass-playing skills. The first was released in 1985. He then settled down to enjoy family life with his wife and son, but by 1988 his then-manager Diane Taren talked him into going back into the recording studio. He started his bass academy during the 1990s and gave workshop clinics via his own Website. Louis Johnson died on May 21, 2015, age 60. His last performance was in 2013.

Tommy Johnson left the group and had a 29 year career with the LAFD.

George's solo work
George Johnson released one single in 1985, "Back Against the Wall", on Quincy Jones' own Qwest label. A complete album (recorded but unreleased) came from that session, as George confirmed when he and Louis were interviewed around 1987/88 for Blues & Soul Magazine in the United Kingdom (see link below). George also delivered guitar work for Steve Arrington's album Dancing in the Key of Life (1985) and had ad-libbed vocals on the track "Think Back And Remember" from the Galaxian album by the Jeff Lorber Fusion, released in 1981 on Arista Records.

Various 1980s reunions and other projects

In 1984 the brothers reunited in the recording studio. The resulting Leon Sylvers-produced LP, Out of Control, did not equal their past success, but it did garner them another R&B hit with "You Keep Me Coming Back". They teamed up again in 1988 to record Kickin, the title track of which ("Kick It to the Curb") was a collaboration with their then-neighbor Irene Cara. Although "Kick It to the Curb" became a minor hit, the album's success was even more limited.

Between the two albums, both George and Louis released their aforementioned solo material and also appeared on Street Shadows, an album by keyboardist/arranger David Diggs, who had provided horn and string arrangements for Winners, Blast!, and Louis' Passage. "Last Night", Streets opening track showcases George's bass-guitar playing. He previously showed his bass skills on tracks like "Teaser" from Winners and "The Great Awakening" from Blast, the same way Louis shows his guitar skills on the duo's various compositions.

Also during this time, the band's song "Tomorrow" (originally an instrumental on the B-side of "Get the Funk Out Ma Face") was recorded with vocals by Tevin Campbell for Quincy Jones' Back on the Block release in 1989. This album also included Jones' hit remake of the Brothers Johnson's "I'll Be Good to You", featuring Ray Charles and Chaka Khan.

Besides the brothers' brief appearance in Japan around 1994 and George guest-appearing at a Graham Central Station concert in Japan (including a released double-CD), the duo launched an expanded US tour in 2002 which got positive, wide exposure. It was visited by many fans and various artists in the entertainment business. Along with a website and discussion-forum, online visitors could share their experiences of the shows by wandering through the Land of Ladies and reliving Funkadelia's heyday. A few years later, a combi-release of live-CD + DVD was released under the name Strawberry Letter 23: Live.

In 2006, Louis gave a duo-show with a drummer on the Poetry in Motion 1 Festival in Maryland. In late 2007 George performed with his own band at a Detroit festival, including a persona called Sir Nose. These days George performs with a special band, an initiative of Michael Henderson that includes Adina Howard, Cherrelle, Ray Parker Jr., and others.

Louis Johnson was found dead at his home in Las Vegas, May 21, 2015. The cause of death was gastrointestinal bleeding of the esophagus.

In 2022, the brothers' song "Ain't We Funkin' Now" was sampled in singer Harry Styles' song 'Daydreaming" from his third album Harry's House.

Discography
Studio albums
{| class="wikitable" style="text-align:center;"
|-
! rowspan="2"| Year
! rowspan="2"| Album
! colspan="7"| Peak chart positions
! rowspan="2"| Certifications
! rowspan="2"| Record label
|- style="font-size:smaller;"
! width="35"| US
! width="35"| USR&B
! width="35"| AUS
! width="35"| CAN
! width="35"| NL
! width="35"| NZ
! width="35"| UK
|-
| rowspan="1"| 1976
| align="left"| Look Out for #1
| 9
| 1
| —
| 25
| —
| —
| —
| align="left"|
 RIAA: Platinum
| rowspan="7"| A&M
|-
| rowspan="1"| 1977
| align="left"| Right on Time
| 13
| 2
| 43
| 36
| —
| 34
| —
| align="left"|
 RIAA: Platinum
|-
| rowspan="1"| 1978
| align="left"| Blam!
| 7
| 1
| —
| 51
| —
| —
| 48
| align="left"|
 RIAA: Platinum
|-
| rowspan="1"| 1980
| align="left"| Light Up the Night
| 5
| 1
| 57
| 58
| 43
| 4
| 22
| align="left"| 
 RIAA: Platinum
 RMNZ: Gold
|-
| rowspan="1"| 1981
| align="left"| Winners
| 48
| 10
| —
| —
| —
| —
| 42
| align="left"|
|-
| rowspan="1"| 1984
| align="left"| Out of Control
| 91
| 20
| —
| —
| —
| —
| —
| align="left"| 
|-
| rowspan="1"| 1988
| align="left"| Kickin'''
| —
| —
| —
| —
| —
| —
| —
| align="left"| 
|-
| colspan="15" style="font-size:90%" | "—" denotes a recording that did not chart or was not released in that territory.
|}

Live albumsStrawberry Letter 23: Live (2004, Goldenlane)

Compilation albums

Singles
{| class="wikitable" style="text-align:center;"
|-
! rowspan="2"| Year
! rowspan="2"| Single
! colspan="8"| Peak chart positions
! rowspan="2"| Certifications
! rowspan="2"| Album
|- style="font-size:smaller;"
! width="35"| US
! width="35"| USR&B
! width="35"| USDan
! width="35"| AUS
! width="35"| CAN
! width="35"| NL
! width="35"| NZ
! width="35"| UK
|-
| rowspan="3"| 1976
| align="left"| "I'll Be Good to You"
| 3
| 1
| —
| —
| 12
| —
| —
| —
| align=left|
 RIAA: Gold
| align=left rowspan="3"| Look Out for #1|-
| align="left"| "Get the Funk Out Ma Face"
| 30
| 4
| 11
| —
| 31
| —
| —
| —
| align=left|
|-
| align="left"| "Free and Single"
| 103
| 26
| —
| —
| —
| —
| —
| —
| align=left|
|-
| rowspan="3" | 1977
| align="left"| "Strawberry Letter 23"
| 5
| 1
| —
| 25
| 8
| 25
| 2
| 35
| align=left|
 RIAA: Gold
| rowspan="4" align="left" | Right on Time|-
| align="left"| "Right on Time" (UK-only release)
|—
|—
|—
|—
|—
|—
|—
|52
|
|-
| align="left"| "Runnin' for Your Lovin'"
| 107
| 20
| —
| —
| —
| —
| —
| —
| align=left|
|-
| rowspan="3"| 1978
| align="left"| "Love Is"
| —
| 50
| —
| —
| —
| —
| —
| —
| align=left|
|-
| align="left"| "Ride-O-Rocket"
| 104
| 45
| —
| —
| —
| —
| —
| 50
| align=left|
| align=left rowspan="2"| Blam!!|-
| align="left"| "Ain't We Funkin' Now"
| 102
| 45
| —
| —
| —
| —
| —
| 43
| align=left|
|-
| rowspan="3"| 1980
| align="left"| "Stomp!"
| 7
| 1
| 1
| 13
| 49
| 11
| 1
| 6
| align=left|
 RMNZ: Gold
| align=left rowspan="3"| Light Up the Night|-
| align="left"| "Light Up the Night"
| —
| 16
| —
| —
| —
| 37
| 19
| 47
| align=left|
|-
| align="left"| "Treasure"
| 73
| 36
| —
| —
| —
| —
| —
| —
| align=left|
|-
| rowspan="2"| 1981
| align="left"| "The Real Thing"
| 67
| 11
| —
| —
| —
| —
| 34
| 50
| align=left|
| align=left rowspan="2"| Winners|-
| align="left"| "Dancin' Free"
| —
| 51
| —
| —
| —
| —
| —
| —
| align=left|
|-
| rowspan="1"| 1982
| align="left"| "Welcome to the Club"
| —
| 13
| —
| —
| —
| —
| 36
| —
| align=left|
| align=left rowspan="2"| Blast!: The Latest and the Greatest|-
| rowspan="1"| 1983
| align="left"| "I'm Giving You All of My Love"
| —
| 75
| —
| —
| —
| —
| —
| —
| align=left|
|-
| rowspan="2"| 1984
| align="left"| "You Keep Me Coming Back"
| 102
| 12
| 22
| —
| —
| —
| —
| 77
| align=left|
| align=left rowspan="2"| Out of Control|-
| align="left"| "Lovers Forever"
| —
| —
| —
| —
| —
| —
| —
| —
| align=left|
|-
| rowspan="3"| 1988
| align="left"| "Kick It to the Curb"
| —
| 52
| —
| —
| —
| —
| —
| —
| align=left|
| align=left rowspan="3"| Kickin
|-
| align="left"| "Party Avenue"
| —
| —
| —
| —
| —
| —
| —
| —
| align=left|
|-
| align="left"| "Still in Love"
| —
| —
| —
| —
| —
| —
| —
| —
| align=left|
|-
| colspan="15" style="font-size:90%" | "—" denotes a recording that did not chart or was not released in that territory.
|}

Videography
1977 – Right on Time1980 – Stomp1981 – The Real Thing1988 – Kick It to the Curb''

See also
List of artists who reached number one on the U.S. dance chart
List of Number 1 Dance Hits (United States)

Notes

References

External links

Brothers Johnson career on A&M Records with gallery, international discography

Blues & Soul-interview (1987/1988)

American dance music groups
American funk musical groups
African-American musical groups
American disco groups
Family musical groups
Grammy Award winners
Musical groups from Los Angeles
Johnson, Brothers
American soul musical groups
Musical groups established in 1975
Musical groups disestablished in 1982
A&M Records artists
Capitol Records artists